André Cypriano (born in Piracicaba, São Paulo, Brazil on May 14, 1964) is a documentary and fine art photographer, known for his photography of traditional lifestyles and practices of lesser known societies in remote corners of the world.

Biography 

André Cypriano graduated with a Bachelor of Business Administration at Centro Universitário das Faculdades Metropolitanas Unidas in São Paulo, Brazil. Concerned with environmental issues, he contributed time and effort as the administrator of "Salva Mar" Save the Sea - a Brazilian organization dedicated to save the whales in North Brazil.
 
In 1990, one year after relocating to the United States, André began to study photography at City College of San Francisco. He has since completed several projects which have been exhibited in several galleries and museums in South America, North America and Europe.

André has been a recipient of the first place award in San Francisco City College's Photography Department of Scholarship (July 1992), the World Image Award Competition promoted by Photo District News in N.Y. (Dec. 1992), New Works Awards - promoted by En Foco in N.Y. (July 1998)., Mother Jones International Fund for Documentary Photography (Sep.1999), Bolsa Vitae de Artes in São Paulo (Jan. 2002), Caracas Think Tank (Jan. 2003), as well as All Roads Photography Program from National Geographic Society (Oct. 2005)

As part of a long term project, Cypriano began to document traditional lifestyles and practices of lesser known societies in remote corners of the world with a slant toward the unique and unusual. Thus far, he has photographed the people of Nias, an island off the northwest coast of Sumatra (Nias - Jumping Stones), the dogs of Bali (Spiritual Quest), the infamous penitentiary of Candido Mendes, in Rio de Janeiro (The Devil's Caldron – book published by Cosac & Naify), the largest shanty town in Brazil, Rio de Janeiro (Rocinha – book published by SENAC Editoras), the 10 most important shantytowns of Rio de Janeiro. The shantytowns of Caracas (The Culture of the Informal Cities – book published by CaracasThinkTank), as well as the culture of resistance of the Quilombolas people (Quilombolas – book published by Aori Produções).  In 2010, André Cypriano participated in Cultures of Resistance, a documentary film directed by Iara Lee.  A 20-year retrospective of his work was exhibited at Frederico Sève Gallery / latincollector in 2012.  His ongoing projects have also been used in educational workshops.

Currently, André Cypriano lives and works in New York City and Rio de Janeiro, and continues to be involved in social and cultural activities.

Books 

 O Caldeirão do Diabo (The Devi's Caldron) - photography and text by André Cypriano, published by Cosac & Naify Edições, 2001. 
 Rocinha - photography and text by André Cypriano, published by Editora SENAC, 2005. 
 Quilombolas: Tradição e Cultura da Resistência - photography by André Cypriano, text by Rafael Sanzio dos Anjos, published by AORI, 2006. 
 Capoeira: Luta, Dança e Jogo da Liberdade - photography by André Cypriano, text by Rodrigo de Almeida and Letícia Pimenta, published by AORI, 2009.

Catalogues 

 2012 - Two Decades, Frederico Seve Gallery
 2011 - Afro-Colombianos, Galeria Portfolio
 2011 - FotoRio 2011, Centro Cultural Correios
 2010 - Capoeira: Luta, Dança e Jogo da Liberdade, Caixa Cultural
 2008 - Rocinha, Museu de Arte de São Paulo Coleção Pirelli
 2007 - Sutil Violento, Itau Cultural
 2002 - Favelas Upgrading - 8. Mostra Internazionale D'Architettura, Fundação Bienal de São Paulo
 2002 - Rocinha, Pinacoteca do Estado de São Paulo
 2001 - Transfigurações - O Rio no Olhar Contemporâneo, Centro Cultural Light

Awards 

 2007 - Coleção Pirelli/MASP de Fotografia - São Paulo, SP -  Brazil
 2007 - Clube da Fotografia do MAM - São Paulo, SP -  Brazil 
 2005 - National Geographic, All Roads Photography Program - Washington, D.C. -  USA
 2003 - Caracas Case Project, Federal Cultural Foundation of Germany and Caracas Think Tank - Caracas, CCS -  Venezuela 
 2002 - Bolsa Vitae de Artes - São Paulo, SP -  Brazil 
 1999 - Mother Jones International Fund for Documentary Photography - San Francisco, CA - USA 
 1998 - En Foco, New Works Award - New York, NY - USA 
 1996 - Lifetouch, Portrait Excellence Award - Burlingame, CA - USA
 1992 - PDN, World Image Awards - New York, NY - USA
 1992 - San Francisco City College, Photography Department of Scholarship - San Francisco, CA - USA

References

External links 
 
 "In Brazil, Finding Dignity in Horror", by Fernanda Santos - The New York Times, (Since December, 2011)
 Afro-Colombianos - Caros Amigos, (Since April, 2011)
 "Afrocolombianos, Afrocolombianas: la libertad y sus rutas, Fotografías de: André Cypriano" - Ministerio de Cultura, (2010)
 "Rocinha" - Foto Favela, (Since November, 2001)
 Mother Jones Fund - Selected Portfolio - Mother Jones, (Since June 1999)
 "En Foco/Photographers" - En Foco, (Since July, 1999)

Brazilian photographers
Photojournalists
Documentary photographers
Brazilian contemporary artists
1964 births
Living people
Fine art photographers